Szany is a village in Győr-Moson-Sopron county, Hungary.

External links

  in Hungarian
 Street map (Hungarian)
 Aerial photographs of Szany

Populated places in Győr-Moson-Sopron County